Haliplus leechi is a species of Haliplus discovered by Wallis in 1933.

References

Haliplidae
Beetles described in 1933